Thomas David Patrick O'Malley (March 24, 1903December 19, 1979) was a U.S. Representative from Wisconsin.

Born in Milwaukee, Wisconsin. He went to school at Loyola College, and the Y.M.C.A. College of Liberal Arts, Chicago. He was elected as a Democrat to the Seventy-third, Seventy-fourth, and Seventy-fifth Congresses (March 4, 1933 – January 3, 1939) as the representative of Wisconsin's 5th congressional district. O'Malley introduced the Johnson–O'Malley Act in the House which was passed in 1934. He resided in Chicago, Illinois until his death on December 19, 1979.

Notes

External links

Politicians from Milwaukee
1903 births
1979 deaths
Democratic Party members of the United States House of Representatives from Wisconsin
20th-century American politicians